Lynn Rothschild can refer to:
 Lynn Forester de Rothschild (born 1954), American-British businesswoman
 Lynn J. Rothschild (born 1957), evolutionary biologist and astrobiologist
 Lynn Schusterman, née Rothschild (born 1939), American billionaire philanthropist